The 1994 New Orleans Saints season was the team's 28th as a member of the National Football League (NFL). They were unable to match their previous season's output of 8–8, winning only seven games. The team failed to qualify for the playoffs for the second consecutive season.

Offseason

NFL Draft

Personnel

Staff

Roster

Regular season

Schedule

Standings

References 

New Orleans Saints seasons
New Orleans
New